Giuseppe Berlato Sella (born 20 October 1939) is an Italian politician from Veneto.

He was born in San Vito di Leguzzano.

A long-time Christian Democrat, Berlato Sella was continuously municipal councillor of Schio from 1975 to 2004 and Mayor from 1987 to 2004. In 1994, after the dissolution of Christian Democracy, he joined the Italian People's Party. From 2000 to 2005 he was president of the regional association of mayors. In 2005 he was elected to the Regional Council of Veneto for Democracy is Freedom – The Daisy and was re-elected in 2010 for the Democratic Party.

References

Living people
1939 births
People from the Province of Vicenza
Christian Democracy (Italy) politicians
20th-century Italian politicians
Italian People's Party (1994) politicians
Democracy is Freedom – The Daisy politicians
Democratic Party (Italy) politicians
21st-century Italian politicians
Mayors of places in Veneto
Members of the Regional Council of Veneto